Sa Re Ga Ma Pa L'il Champs International is an Indian televised children's singing competition announced by Sa Re Ga Ma Pa Challenge 2007 host, Aditya Narayan, on 28 July 2007. The season began on 19 October 2007 with 28 contestants. The show was broadcast on Fridays, Saturdays and Sundays. Anamika Choudhari won this competition on 1 March 2008. It is the second instalment of the "Sa Re Ga Ma Pa L'il Champs" series and the fifth public voting competition in the "Sa Re Ga Ma Pa" series. Chronologically, the show was preceded by Sa Re Ga Ma Pa Challenge 2007.

Narayan mentioned that children aged 6–14 worldwide could send recordings of their songs on a CD if they wished to participate in the competition. Furthermore, on 13 October 2007, Narayan also added that Pritam and Sonu Nigam would be the judges of the show. However, Pritam was later replaced by Suresh Wadkar.

Regional auditions phase

Locations
The auditions were held in the following cities in India:
Chandigarh:  – 22 September
Ahmedabad:  – 28 September
Delhi:  – 23 September
Kolkata: – 23 September
Mumbai:  – 29 September

International auditions took place in the United Kingdom, Dubai, USA, South Africa, Malaysia, Pakistan, New Zealand, Singapore, Fiji, Kenya, Australia, Israel and Hong Kong.

Most participants were from India. No foreign contestants reached the finals

Judges
Sonu Nigam
Suresh Wadkar

Episode themes
Just as was done in previous Sa Re Ga Ma Pa shows, the idea of themes is used to determine the contestants' versatility and ability to sing different genres.

Episode 1 – Week 1 (Fri, 19 October) – Introduction to Indian Contestants
Episode 2 – Week 1 (Sat, 20 October) – Introduction to Foreign Contestants
Episode 3 – Week 2 (Fri, 26 October) – Contestants' Choice
Episode 4 – Week 2 (Sat, 27 October) – Contestants' Choice
Episode 5 – Week 3 
Episode 6 – Week 3 (Sat, 3 November) – "Masti and Dhamaal" Songs
Episode 7 – Week 4 (Fri, 9 November) – Diwali Special
Episode 8 – Week 4 (Sat, 10 November) – Rock and Roll Songs
Episode 9 – Week 5 (Fri, 16 November) – Children's Day Special 
Episode 10 – Week 5 (Sat, 17 November) – Comedy Special 
Episode 11 – Week 6 (Fri, 23 November) – Asha Bhonsle's Songs
Episode 12 – Week 6 (Sat, 24 November)
Episode 13 – Week 7 (Fri, 30 November) – Contestant's Favorite Songs
Episode 14 – Week 7 (Sat, 1 December) – Retro Theme
Episode 15 – Week 8 (Fri, 7 December) – Hungama Songs
Episode 16 – Week 8 (Sat, 8 December) – Aamir Khan's Songs
Episode 17 – Week 9 (Fri, 14 December) – 
Episode 18 – Week 9 (Sat, 15 December) – 
Episode 19 – Week 10 (Fri, 21 December) – Balle Balle Punjabi Songs
Episode 20 – Week 10 (Sat, 22 December) – Hits of Karisma Kapoor
Episode 21 – Week 11 (Fri, 28 December) – Sonu Nigam's Songs
Episode 22 – Week 11 (Sat, 29 December) – Disco Special
Episode 23 – Week 12 (Fri, 4 January) – Beach Special
Episode 24 – Week 12 (Sat, 5 January) – Parent's Special
Episode 25 – Week 13 (Fri, 11 January) – Arabic Music
Episode 26 – Week 13 (Sat, 12 January) – Mela Special
Episode 27 – Week 14 (Fri, 18 January) – Sufi Songs
Episode 28 – Week 14 (Sat, 19 January) – Hits of Arshad Warsi/Ayesha Takia 
Episode 29 – Week 15 (Fri, 25 January) – Train Songs
Episode 30 – Week 15 (Sat, 26 January) – Patriotic Songs
Episode 31 – Week 16 (Fri, 1 February) – Suresh Wadkar's Songs
Episode 32 – Week 16 (Sat, 2 February) – New Songs of 2007 & Romantic Songs 
Episode 33 – Week 17 (Fri, 8 February) – Devotional Songs
Episode 34 – Week 17 (Sat, 9 February) – Chaand & Bhoot Songs
Episode 35 – Week 18 (Fri, 15 February) – Classical Songs
Episode 36 – Week 18 (Sat, 16 February) – Hits of Kajol/Ajay Devgan

Celebrity guests
Week 3 (2 November) – Anand Raj Anand
Week 4 (9 November) – Vishal–Shekhar
Week 5 (16 November) – Amrita-Nagin
Week 6 (23 November 24 November) – Asha Bhonsle (both days)
Week 7 (1 December) – Soha Ali Khan
Week 8 (7 December) – Usha Uthup 
Week 8 (8 December) – Aamir Khan
Week 9 (14 December 15 December) – Alka Yagnik (both days)
Week 10 (21 December) – Richa Sharma
Week 10 (22 December) – Karisma Kapoor
Week 11 (28 December) – Agam Kumar Nigam
Week 11 (29 December) – Mithun Chakraborty, Amrita Rao, Nikhil Dwivedi
Week 12 (5 January) – Deepa Narayan
Week 13 (11 January) – Nagesh Kukunoor, Shreyas Talpade, Salim–Sulaiman
Week 14 (18 January) – Rajpal Yadav
Week 14 (19 January) – Ayesha Takia, Arshad Warsi
Week 15 (26 January) – Bipasha Basu
Week 16 (1 February) – Vishal Bhardwaj 
Week 16 (2 February) – Kunal Khemu, Sameer Tandon
Week 17 (9 February) – Raju Shrivastav
Week 18 (15 February) – Amjad Ali Khan
Week 18 (16 February]) – Kajol, Ajay Devgan

Grand Finale: (1 March) Kajol and Ajay Devgan

References

Footnotes

External links 
 SaReGaMaPa Lil Champs International
 Sa Re Ga Ma Pa L'il Champs International 2007–08
 Sa Re Ga Ma Pa L'il Champs 2007
 Sa Re Ga Ma Pa L'il Champs International 2007 forums
Saregamapa Lil Champs International videos, reviews and latest mews
Sa Re Ga Ma Pa Lil Champs International live updates, videos and news
Saregamapa Lil Champs International
Saregamapa Lil Champs International 2007 videos, reviews and latest news

2007 Indian television series debuts
2008 Indian television series endings
Sa Re Ga Ma Pa
Television series about children
Zee TV original programming